Gannavaram bus station is a bus station located at Gannavaram in Vijayawada of the Indian state of Andhra Pradesh. It is owned and operated by Andhra Pradesh State Road Transport Corporation. The station is also equipped with a bus depot for storage and maintenance of buses.
APS RTC operates city bus services from different parts of the city and it also operates buses outside city to Hyderabad and Eluru.

Transport

References

Bus stations in Andhra Pradesh
Transport in Vijayawada
Buildings and structures in Krishna district
Roads in Krishna district